Roger Troutman (November 29, 1951 – April 25, 1999), also known as Roger, was an American singer, songwriter, record producer, multi-instrumentalist and the founder of the band Zapp who helped spearhead the funk movement and heavily influenced West Coast hip hop due to the scene's heavy sampling of his music over the years. Troutman was well known for his use of the talk box, a device that is connected to an instrument (frequently a keyboard, but most commonly a guitar) to create different vocal effects. Roger used a custom-made talkbox—the Electro Harmonix "Golden Throat"—through a Moog Minimoog and later in his career a Yamaha DX100 FM synthesizer. As both band leader of Zapp and in his subsequent solo releases, he scored a bevy of funk and R&B hits throughout the 1980s and regularly collaborated with hip hop artists in the 1990s.

Biography

Early career
Born in Hamilton, Ohio, Roger was the fourth of ten children. A graduate of Central State University, his first band was called the Crusaders; however, they are not to be confused with the jazz group featuring Joe Sample and Wilton Felder. Troutman's band played in Cincinnati and recorded a single, "Busted Surfboard"/"Seminole". The band members were Rick Schoeny, Roy Beck, Dave Spitzmiller, and Denny Niebold. Troutman had formed various other bands with his four brothers, including Little Roger, and the Vels, and Roger and the Human Body. In 1977, he and the Human Body issued "Freedom", their first single.

Within two years, Roger and his brothers were discovered by George Clinton, who signed the newly christened Zapp to his Uncle Jam Records label in 1979. The original line-up consisted of Roger Troutman, Larry Troutman, Lester Troutman, Terry Troutman, Gregory Jackson and Bobby Glover. Zapp made their professional television debut on the first and only Funk Music Awards show.

A year later, as Uncle Jam Records was forced to close, Troutman signed with Bootsy Collins under Rubber Band Music to Warner Bros. Records and released his self-titled debut 'Zapp', which yielded "More Bounce to the Ounce", produced by Collins, co- produced, written, composed and performed by Troutman. The song peaked at number 2 on the Billboard Soul Singles chart in late 1980. The debut album reached the top 20 of the Billboard 200.

From 1980 to 1985, Zapp released the gold-selling albums Zapp, Zapp II, Zapp III and The New Zapp IV U, including the Top 10 R&B singles "Be Alright", "Dance Floor", "I Can Make You Dance", "Heartbreaker", "It Doesn't Really Matter" and "Computer Love". Throughout Zapp's history, around 15 musicians participated. In 1993, Zapp released their biggest-selling album: Zapp & Roger: All the Greatest Hits. It featured remixed cuts of Troutman's solo singles along with a new single "Slow and Easy", (featured vocalists Shirley Murdock and Ronnie Diamond). The album sold over two million copies. The album Zapp VI: Back by Popular Demand was released in 2002 by the remaining brothers after the deaths of Roger and Larry.

Solo career and production work on other artists
In 1981, Troutman cut The Many Facets of Roger, his first solo album. Featuring a funk cover of Marvin Gaye's "I Heard It Through the Grapevine", which went to number 1 on the R&B singles chart, the album sold over a million copies. The album also featured the hit "So Ruff, So Tuff", which was similar to "More Bounce..." as were most Roger/Zapp singles during this time. The same year, Troutman recorded with Parliament-Funkadelic on the band's final Warner Brothers' album The Electric Spanking of War Babies.

In 1984, Troutman issued his second solo album The Saga Continues..., which featured the singles "Girl Cut It Out", "It's in the Mix" (which was dedicated to Soul Train and its host Don Cornelius), and a cover of Wilson Pickett's "In the Midnight Hour", which featured gospel group the Mighty Clouds of Joy. In 1987, Troutman scored his most successful solo album with Unlimited!, carried by the hit "I Want to Be Your Man" which rose to number 3 on the Billboard Hot 100 and number 1 on the R&B chart.

Alongside his successful career as Zapp member and solo artist, Troutman also became a producer and writer for other artists including Shirley Murdock, whose 1985 Platinum debut featured the Roger-produced hit "As We Lay". He also produced for Zapp member Dale DeGroat on his solo efforts. In 1988, Troutman made an appearance on Scritti Politti's third album Provision, providing talk box vocals on the songs "Boom There She Was" and "Sugar and Spice".

Three years later, Troutman released his final solo album with Bridging the Gap, featuring the hit "Everybody (Get Up)". He worked with Elvis Costello on the song "The Other Side of Summer". In 1989, NBA Entertainment selected Troutman among a variety of candidates to record a tribute song called "I'm So Happy" for Kareem Abdul-Jabbar.

Career re-emergence
Troutman toured after the release of All the Greatest Hits. He was invited to appear as guest artist on several hip-hop albums, including Snoop Dogg's 1993 debut Doggystyle. In 1995 he was featured on Eazy-E's posthumous album Str8 off tha Streetz of Muthaphukkin Compton on "Eternal E". The same year Troutman performed vocals on 2Pac and Dr. Dre's single "California Love". The song became Troutman's biggest-selling and most successful single to date as the song reached number one on the Billboard Hot 100 and sold over two million copies, and received a Grammy nomination for Best Rap Performance by a Duo or Group. Troutman then produced a top 10 R&B hit cover of the Persuaders' "Thin Line Between Love and Hate", performed by Shirley Murdock and R&B group H-Town, with talk box by Troutman. The movie soundtrack to A Thin Line Between Love and Hate also included a club hit "Chocolate City". In 1998, he appeared in a remix version of Sounds of Blackness' "Hold On (A Change Is Coming)", which sampled Zapp's "Doo-Wah Ditty (Blow That Thang)". Roger last recorded on the song "Master of the Game" from rapper Kool Keith's album Black Elvis/Lost In Space.

Death
On the morning of April 25, 1999, Troutman was found shot and critically wounded outside his northwest Dayton recording studio around 7:00 a.m. According to doctors, the 47-year-old had been shot several times in the torso. Troutman died during surgery at the Good Samaritan Hospital and Health Center. Roger's brother Larry was found dead in a car a few blocks away with a single self-inflicted gunshot wound to the head. The car matched the description of a vehicle leaving the scene of Roger Troutman's shooting, according to witnesses.

Discography

Studio albums

Singles

As featured artist

Soundtrack appearances

Guest appearances

References

External links
 
 
 

1951 births
1999 deaths
1999 murders in the United States
American funk bass guitarists
American male bass guitarists
American male guitarists
American funk guitarists
American funk keyboardists
American funk singers
American boogie musicians
American harmonica players
American multi-instrumentalists
American rhythm and blues singer-songwriters
Zapp (band) members
P-Funk members
American murder victims
Guitarists from Ohio
Record producers from Ohio
Singer-songwriters from Ohio
Musicians from Dayton, Ohio
People from Hamilton, Ohio
People murdered in Ohio
Deaths by firearm in Ohio
Midwest hip hop musicians
Murdered African-American people
Murder–suicides in the United States
20th-century American bass guitarists
American soul guitarists
Fratricides
African-American male songwriters
African-American guitarists
Central State University alumni
20th-century African-American male singers